Morris County is a county located near the eastern border of the U.S. state of Texas. As of the 2010 census, its population was 11,973. Its county seat is Daingerfield. Morris County is probably named for William Wright Morris, an early judge and planter from Henderson, also in northeast Texas. As of 2016, Morris County is no longer one of six prohibition, or entirely dry, counties in the state of Texas. Morris County is now "partially wet."

History
In the nineteenth century, this area was settled primarily by European-American planters and farmers, many of whom brought enslaved African Americans with them or purchased others to work as laborers on the cotton plantations they developed. Cotton was most important, but farmers also cultivated other commodity crops before the American Civil War. Eastern Texas was the region of the state with the highest number and proportion of slaves.

The area has continued to be mostly rural and agricultural. In the 21st century, African Americans comprise a significant minority in the county.

Geography
It is the fifth-smallest county in Texas by land area and fourth-smallest by total area.

Major highways

Adjacent counties
 Bowie County (north)
 Cass County (east)
 Marion County (southeast)
 Upshur County (south)
 Camp County (southwest)
 Titus County (west)
 Red River County (northwest)

Communities

Cities
 Daingerfield (county seat)
 Hughes Springs (mostly in Cass County)
 Lone Star
 Omaha

Town
 Naples

Unincorporated community
 Cason
 Jenkins

Demographics

Note: the US Census treats Hispanic/Latino as an ethnic category. This table excludes Latinos from the racial categories and assigns them to a separate category. Hispanics/Latinos can be of any race.

As of the census of 2000, there were 13,048 people, 5,215 households, and 3,749 families residing in the county. In 2020, its population was 11,973. The population density was 51 people per square mile (20/km2). There were 6,017 housing units at an average density of 24 per square mile (9/km2). In 2000, the racial makeup of the county was 71.71% White, 24.13% Black or African American, 0.53% Native American, 0.18% Asian, 0.06% Pacific Islander, 2.28% from other races, and 1.12% from two or more races; 3.66% of the population were Hispanic or Latino of any race.

There were 5,215 households, out of which 29.50% had children under the age of 18 living with them, 53.90% were married couples living together, 14.10% had a female householder with no husband present, and 28.10% were non-families. 25.80% of all households were made up of individuals, and 13.20% had someone living alone who was 65 years of age or older. The average household size was 2.47 and the average family size was 2.95.

In the county, the population was spread out, with 25.20% under the age of 18, 7.80% from 18 to 24, 24.30% from 25 to 44, 24.50% from 45 to 64, and 18.30% who were 65 years of age or older. The median age was 40 years. For every 100 females there were 92.70 males. For every 100 females age 18 and over, there were 87.40 males.

The median income for a household in the county was $29,011, and the median income for a family was $35,326. Males had a median income of $30,917 versus $20,270 for females. The per capita income for the county was $15,612.  About 14.90% of families and 18.30% of the population were below the poverty line, including 25.40% of those under age 18 and 12.90% of those age 65 or over.

Education
The following school districts serve Morris County:
 Daingerfield-Lone Star ISD (small portion in Titus County)
 Hughes Springs ISD (mostly in Cass County)
 Pewitt CISD (small portions in Titus and Cass counties)

Morris County is also served by the Northeast Texas Community College, whose main campus is in southeastern Titus County, but it has a small satellite campus in Naples.

Politics
Morris County was a longtime Democratic stronghold, like many rural Southern counties were in the Jim Crow and immediate post-Jim Crow eras. (It only voted for a Republican in 1972.) The 2000 election was the last time the county voted in favor of a Democratic presidential nominee.

See also

 Dry counties
 National Register of Historic Places listings in Morris County, Texas
 Recorded Texas Historic Landmarks in Morris County

References

External links
 Morris County website
 

 
1875 establishments in Texas
Populated places established in 1875